Mamady (Mamaźı) is a rural locality (a village) in Azyakovsky Selsoviet, Burayevsky District, Bashkortostan, Russia. The population was 339 as of 2010. There are 5 streets.

Geography 
Mamady is located 23 km southeast of Burayevo (the district's administrative centre) by road. Aldarovo is the nearest rural locality.

References 

Rural localities in Burayevsky District